Dyschirius nianus is a species of ground beetle in the subfamily Scaritinae. It was described by Fedorenko in 1993.

References

nianus
Beetles described in 1993